The 2008 North Dakota Fighting Sioux football team represented North Dakota University as a member of the Great West Conference during the 2008 NCAA Division I FCS football season. Led by first-year head coach Chris Mussman, the Fighting Sioux compiled an overall record of 6–4 with a mark of 1–2 in conference play, tying for third place in the GWC. North Dakota played home games at the Alerus Center in Grand Forks, North Dakota.

Schedule

Statistical leaders

References

North Dakota
North Dakota Fighting Hawks football seasons
North Dakota Fighting Sioux football